Harvey County (county code HV) is a county located in the U.S. state of Kansas. As of the 2020 census, the county population was 34,024. Its county seat and most populous city is Newton.

History

In 1854, the Kansas Territory was organized, then in 1861 Kansas became the 34th U.S. state.

In 1871, the Atchison, Topeka and Santa Fe Railway extended a main line from Emporia to Newton.

In 1872, Harvey County was founded, and named in honor of the fifth Governor of Kansas James M. Harvey.

Geography
The Little Arkansas River flows through the county.

Adjacent counties
 Marion County (northeast)
 Butler County (east)
 Sedgwick County (south)
 Reno County (west)
 McPherson County (northwest)

Demographics

Harvey County is part of the Wichita, KS Metropolitan Statistical Area.

2000 census
As of the 2000 census, there were 32,869 people, 12,581 households, and 8,932 families residing in the county. There were 13,378 housing units at an average density of 25 per square mile (10/km2). The racial makeup of the county was 91.04% White, 1.59% Black or African American, 0.52% Native American, 0.52% Asian, 0.03% Pacific Islander, 4.17% from other races, and 2.14% from two or more races. Hispanic or Latino of any race were 7.97% of the population.

There were 12,581 households, out of which 32.80% had children under the age of 18 living with them, 60.20% were married couples living together, 7.70% had a female householder with no husband present, and 29.00% were non-families. 25.80% of all households were made up of individuals, and 11.60% had someone living alone who was 65 years of age or older.  The average household size was 2.50 and the average family size was 3.00.

In the county, the population was spread out, with 26.00% under the age of 18, 9.10% from 18 to 24, 26.50% from 25 to 44, 21.60% from 45 to 64, and 16.80% who were 65 years of age or older.  The median age was 38 years. For every 100 females, there were 94.50 males.  For every 100 females age 18 and over, there were 91.60 males.

The median income for a household in the county was $40,907, and the median income for a family was $48,793. Males had a median income of $35,037 versus $22,492 for females. The per capita income for the county was $18,715.  About 4.20% of families and 6.40% of the population were below the poverty line, including 7.50% of those under age 18 and 5.00% of those age 65 or over.

Government

Presidential elections

Laws
Following amendment to the Kansas Constitution in 1986, the county remained a prohibition, or "dry", county until 1996, when voters approved the sale of alcoholic liquor by the individual drink with a 30% food sales requirement.

The county voted "No" on the 2022 Kansas Value Them Both Amendment, an anti-abortion ballot measure, by 53% to 47% despite backing Donald Trump with 59% of the vote to Joe Biden's 39% in the 2020 presidential election.

Education

Colleges
 Bethel College in North Newton
 Hesston College in Hesston

Unified school districts
 Burrton USD 369
 Newton USD 373
 Sedgwick USD 439
 Halstead–Bentley USD 440
 Hesston USD 460

School district office in neighboring county
 Remington USD 206
 Peabody–Burns USD 398
 Goessel USD 411
 Moundridge USD 423

Communities

Cities
 Burrton
 Halstead
 Hesston
 Newton
 North Newton
 Sedgwick
 Walton

Unincorporated communities
 McLain
 Patterson
 Putnam
 Zimmerdale

Ghost town
 Annelly
 Van Arsdale

Townships
Harvey County is divided into fifteen townships.  The cities of Halstead and Newton are considered governmentally independent and are excluded from the census figures for the townships.  In the following table, the population center is the largest city (or cities) included in that township's population total, if it is of a significant size.

See also
 National Register of Historic Places listings in Harvey County, Kansas
 List of people from Harvey County, Kansas
 March 1990 Central US tornado outbreak
 Chisholm Trail

References

Notes

Further reading

County
 Mitchell Map of Harvey County, Kansas; Grant Mitchell; 15 pages; 1926.
 Standard Atlas of Harvey County, Kansas; Geo. A. Ogle & Co; 70 pages; 1918.
 Plat Book of Harvey County, Kansas; North West Publishing Co; 34 pages; 1902.
 Historical Atlas of Harvey County, Kansas; 33 pages; John P. Edwards; 1882.

Newton
 Bernhard Warkentin and the Kansas Mennonite Pioneers; David A. Haury; Mennonite Life; December 1974.

External links

County
 
 Harvey County - Directory of Public Officials
 Harvey County - Economic Development Council
Historical
 Harvey County Historical Society
 Harvey County Genealogical Society
 Kansas State Historical Society
Maps
 Harvey County Maps: Current, Historic, KDOT
 Kansas Highway Maps: Current, Historic, KDOT
 Kansas Railroad Maps: Current, 1996, 1915, KDOT and Kansas Historical Society

 
Kansas counties
1872 establishments in Kansas
Wichita, KS Metropolitan Statistical Area
Populated places established in 1872